Mir Hamza (born 10 September 1992) is a Pakistani cricketer. He made his Test debut for the Pakistan cricket team in October 2018. He belongs to Khilji tribe.

Domestic career
In April 2018, Hamza was named in Baluchistan's squad for the 2018 Pakistan Cup.

In January 2019, he signed with Sussex County Cricket Club to play in nine first-class games in the 2019 County Championship in England. In September 2019, he was named in Sindh's squad for the 2019–20 Quaid-e-Azam Trophy tournament.

International career
He played in a tour match between Pakistan and England in the UAE in October 2015. In September 2017, he was named in Pakistan's Test squad for their series against Sri Lanka, but he did not play.

In August 2018, he was one of thirty-three players to be awarded a central contract for the 2018–19 season by the Pakistan Cricket Board (PCB). The following month, he was named in Pakistan's Test squad for their series against Australia. He made his Test debut for Pakistan against Australia on 16 October 2018.

In December 2022, he was named in Pakistan's Test squad for their series against New Zealand.

References

External links
 

1992 births
Living people
Pakistani cricketers
Pakistan Test cricketers
Cricketers from Karachi
Karachi cricketers
Karachi Kings cricketers
Quetta Gladiators cricketers
Sindh cricketers
Sussex cricketers